Kashi – Ab Na Rahe Tera Kagaz Kora or simply known as Kashi is a Hindi television series which was broadcast on Imagine TV. The show reflected the story of six-year-old Kashi who was born in a lower-caste family and her journey to fulfill her dreams. The show also reflected the situation of rural India especially Bihar where lower castes were being exploited by the so-called upper castes.

Characters and plot
The story is based in a remote village named Dholkipura in the Indian state of Bihar. Parbatram (Pankaj Jha) is a postman who belongs to a lower caste and lives in a joint family with his wife Ishwari (Sai Deodhar) and her daughter Kashi (Jannat Zubair Rahmani). The other members in the family are:

Kashi is the main character. Her mother died from drinking poisoned water. Her dream is to go to school, and most of the story is focused on her wanting to study. She is really smart. She does make her dream come true, but it happens after she goes through a lot of pain. Kashi is really hardworking and never lies. After the leap, the viewers learn that Kashi has feelings towards Shaurya. Kashi sacrifices her love for Shaurya for Beyjanti's happiness; when Beyjanti realizes this she call off the engagement.

Shaurya (Dev Joshi) is the Malkian's son. At first he is mean to Kashi, but he later realizes that she is good, and he becomes one of her best friends. He tries to help Kashi. When his father and mother see how close they are, they send him to boarding school. After coming back from school Shaurya wants to marry Kashi. But his parents have already fixed his marriage with Beyjanti, though, at the end he and Kashi do get engaged.

Beyjanti is one of Kashi's best friends and sticks up for her when she sees someone doing something wrong to her. She also is friends with Shaurya. Beyjanti is really stubborn, spoiled and ill-tempered. She doesn't do that well in school; she went to school because Kashi went to school. After the leap Beyjanti is enthusiastic to marry Shaurya, but she later realizes that Kashi and Shaurya love each other, and it's been evident since their childhood. She calls off the engagement and wants Shaurya and Kashi to get married.

Mangat Ram (Sunil Chauhan) is the elder brother of Parbatram and he pulls a cycle rickshaw to earn his living. He is a simple man who is influenced by his wife and is jealous of Parbatram as he earns more than him which arises some misunderstanding between them. He loves Kashi very much and takes care of Ishwari.

Jai Devi (Diksha Thakur) is the wife of Mangat Ram. She is a very clever woman and always tell curse words to Parbat and his family. She is a self-proclaimed ruler of the house and makes her husband dance on her fingertips.

Ganga, Chhotu and Kallu are the children of Mangat Ram and Jai Devi. All of them love Kashi very much and all four kids are best friends.

Kalicharan is the younger brother of Parbatram. He has always dreamed to live a luxurious life and hated the village life. One day he robbed the house taking all the "valuables" of the poor family and fled the house and village without getting unnoticed.

Sureeli is the wife of Kalicharan and feels very neglected in the house after her husband left the house. She is a very simple woman and passes her time by housework (Jhadu, Pochha and Bartan) and playing with Kashi.

Lakshmi (Poonam Joshi) is the only sister of the three brothers and is mentally challenged. Though being a mental patient, everybody in the family loves her except Jaidevi. She passes most of her time sitting on the village bus stop waiting for her husband who has been missing since the day they got married.

Cast

 Jannat Zubair Rahmani as Kashi
 Dev Joshi as Shaurya
 Pankaj Jha as Parbat Ram
 Sai Deodhar as Ishwari
 Sunil Chauhan as Mangat Ram
 Diksha Thakur as Jai Devi
 Poonam Joshi as Lakshmi
 Pooja Trivedi as Surili
 Sanjay Swaraj as Thakur Jagan Nath
 Neetika Anand as  Sarpanch Uma Devi Mishra
 Gaurav Bajaj as Dhruv

References

Imagine TV original programming
Indian drama television series
2010 Indian television series debuts
2010 Indian television series endings